Solenopsis fugax is a myrmicine ant of the genus Solenopsis.

It is the only member of its genus to be native to the British Isles, and although rare, it has been taken by Horace Donisthorpe in a number of localities on England's southern coast, including Sandown and Shanklin on the Isle of Wight, and also in the southwesterly region of Lyme Regis It Can Be Found Throughout Europe And Central Asia and some parts of South West Asia.

The species is a thief ant and usually has its nest near another species, stealing food by entering the foreign colony through minute tunnels dug from their own nest.

Relations 
Solenopsis fugax is a close relative of some tropical species from the genus Solenopsis; some of its many close relatives are S. geminata, S. molesta and S. invicta. The key difference is that the more temperately adapted Solenopsis fugax hibernates in the winter to avoid the harsh cold and lack of food found in these temperate environments. S. fugax is also separated by its lighter colour.

References

External links

fugax
Insects described in 1798